André Eglevsky (21 December 19174 December 1977) was a Russian-born ballet dancer and teacher who studied in France and, from 1932, danced with Colonel W. de Basil's Ballet Russe de Monte Carlo for several years, as well as other companies in Europe and New York City. He became a United States citizen in the late 1930s and danced with the American Ballet Theatre and New York City Ballet. After retiring from performance in 1958, he set up his own ballet school and the Eglevsky Ballet Company in New York.

Early life and education
Eglevsky was born in Moscow. After the Revolution, he and his mother emigrated to France when he was eight, his mother having decided that his talent as a dancer demanded that he be properly trained. Many classically trained dancers and teachers had emigrated to France and London in this period. Eglevsky studied ballet in Nice with Maria Nevelskaya (also known as Maria Nevelska formerly of the Bolshoi Ballet), Lubov Egorova, Mathilde Kschessinska, Alexandre Volinine, Olga Preobrajenska, and Leon Woizikowski in Paris, and Nicholas Legat in London.

Career
At the age of fourteen, Eglevsky joined Colonel W. de Basil's Ballet Russe de Monte Carlo, and after six months was dancing leading roles in such ballets as Swan Lake, Les Sylphides, and Les Présages. In 1935 he joined Igor Youskevitch as the company's Premier Danseur, and a year later joined René Blum's Ballet Russe de Monte Carlo.

Eglevsky travelled to the United States in 1937, and was premier danseur in George Balanchine's American Ballet (later New York City Ballet) until 1938.  He also danced at the Radio City Music Hall and in the Broadway musical Great Lady.

In the late 1930s, Eglevsky married the ballerina Leda Anchutina. Their daughter Marina Eglevsky is also a ballerina, while their son André Eglevsky, Jr. became an orthopedic surgeon who currently resides in Fredericksburg, Virginia.

After becoming a United States citizen, in 1939 Eglevsky rejoined the Ballet Russe de Monte Carlo, touring with them until 1942. For the following four years he danced with the Ballet Theatre (now the American Ballet Theatre) in New York City. He also danced as a guest star with Léonide Massine's Ballet Russe Highlights in 1944 and 1945.

In 1946, Eglevsky rejoined Col. de Basil, now director of the Original Ballet Russe, and a year later became premier danseur of the Grand Ballet du Marquis de Cuevas. From 1951 to 1958 he was a principal with the New York City Ballet. In 1952, he appeared in Charlie Chaplin's film Limelight.

He trained as his protégé the dancer Alan Bergman. After having a short career on stage, Bergman developed the Dans-EZ dancewear range.

Upon his retirement in 1958, Eglevsky and his wife started a ballet school in Massapequa, New York. They also founded the Eglevsky Ballet Company. Both continue under the artistic direction of Maurice Brandon Curry. Eglevsky died in 1977 in Elmira, New York, of a heart attack at the age of fifty-nine.

Filmography

References

External links

"André Eglevsky" by Dick Andros
Eglevsky Ballet website

American male ballet dancers
Russian male ballet dancers
Soviet emigrants to France
French emigrants to the United States
White Russian emigrants to the United States
1917 births
1977 deaths
Ballets Russes dancers
People from Massapequa, New York
20th-century American ballet dancers